Shrivardhan taluka is a taluka in Raigad district in the Indian state of Maharashtra. The town of Shrivardhan is the administrative headquarters of this taluka.

Raigad district
As of August 2015, there were 8 subdivisions, 15 talukas, 1,970 villages, 60 revenue circles and 350 sazzas within Raigad district, the talukas being: Alibag, Karjat, Khalapur, Mahad, Mangaon, Mhasala, Murud, Panvel, Pen, Poladpur, Roha, Shrivardhan, Sudhagad Pali, Tala and Uran.

References

Talukas in Maharashtra
Talukas in Raigad district